The Tenth Brother written by the Slovene writer Josip Jurčič, is the first novel in Slovene. It was published in 1866 in Klagenfurt.

The novel was adapted into a film of the same name in 1982.

Summary 
The Tenth Brother follows the life of Lovre Kvas, a young scholar, who has to somehow earn enough money to go to university in Vienna, and therefore accepts the position of a home-schooling teacher. He moves to a town called Slemenišče where he lives with a wealthy family. The family are the master and his wife, their twenty-three-year-old daughter Manica and their nine-year-old son, Balček. They are all very nice and Lovre starts to develop feelings for Manica. His newly made friend, Martinek Spak, who calls himself the tenth brother, supports their relationship. Marijan, a family friend who is also in love with Manica and always thought he would marry her someday, is very unhappy when he sees Lovre and Manica are in love. He gets into a fight with Martinek and ends up shooting him and is hit over the head with the shotgun in return. Martinek dies and Marijan's father, who was also the father of Martinek from a previous marriage, decides to tell Marijan the truth about his past. He then commits suicide. Because Marijan's father left his estate to Lovre, the latter can now return after being banned for his affair with Manica. The two get married and Marijan marries another woman so the story has a happy ending.

Desetnica and deseti brat 
There is an old tradition in some Slavic countries (that doesn't exist anymore) where if a couple has ten children of the same gender in a row, the tenth child has to leave. They then travel around the country and are said to possess supernatural abilities such as talking to animals and plants, being able to forecast the future ... If the tenth child is a girl, she is called "desetnica" (a word, derived from the word "ten" (deset)). If the child is a boy, he is called "deseti brat" (the tenth brother).

This motif has been illustrated in fiction many times, such as the Desetnica tale and the novel Deseti brat.

See also
List of Slovene novels

External links 
Review of the film on nytimes.com

Slovenian novels
1866 novels
Slovene-language novels
Slovenian novels adapted into films